Chiretolpis erubescens is a moth of the family Erebidae first described by George Hampson in 1891. It is found in India's Nilgiri Mountains.

References

Nudariina
Moths described in 1891
Moths of Asia